La Caleta olvidada is a 1958 Chilean film directed by Bruno Gebel. It was entered into the 1958 Cannes Film Festival.

Plot
Two men, a father and son from the city, arrive in Horcones cove with the intention of transforming an old farmhouse into a fishing enterprise. The young people in the town are enthusiastic about the outsiders' idea, but the adults disapprove. In the end, the elders force the newcomers to leave, choosing to continue with their humble yet peaceful way of life. Only the industrialist's son, captivated by the tranquility of the place, decides to abandon the city and stay with the fishermen.

Cast
 Sara Astica
 Fernando Davanzo
 Claudio Di Girolamo
 Armando Fenoglio
 Ximena Marin

References

External links

1958 films
Chilean drama films
1950s Spanish-language films